Eric Zicklin is an American television producer and writer.

He is best known for his work on the sitcoms Something So Right ,Frasier and Dharma & Greg. His other television credits include Stark Raving Mad, Center of the Universe, Twenty Good Years, Yes, Dear and Hot in Cleveland.

In 1995, in one of his first television jobs as a writer he won a Primetime Emmy Award for the Michael Moore series TV Nation, as a part of the writing team. In 2001, he was nominated for another Emmy for his work on Frasier.

He is married to fellow television producer/writer Dottie Dartland Zicklin.

References

External links

1967 births
American television producers
American television writers
American male television writers
Living people
People from New Jersey
Primetime Emmy Award winners
Date of birth missing (living people)